The Church of Saint Barbara, Berdychiv, usually known as St Barbara's Catholic Church, is an urban Catholic parish church in the City of Berdychiv, now in Ukraine and formerly part of the Russias.

It was founded in the mid-18th century on the site of an earlier Polish Carmelite monastery.

History
Dedicated to Saint Barbara, its name preserves the memory of an earlier local Carmelite monastery founded in 1630.

St Barbara's Church is regarded as a Ukrainian national architectural monument, being one of the most recognizable buildings in Berdychiv. The church was first built on its present site in 1759 by Countess Barbara Tyszkiewicz, daughter and heiress of a wealthy Lithuanian magnate whose dowry included Berdychiv. She dedicated the newly built basilica to her patron saint, Saint Barbara. Later, under Tsarist Russian-rule, the original wooden structure was demolished being replaced by an elegant stone edifice which was completed in 1826.

St Barbara's Church has attracted a number of distinguished people throughout its history, in view of the Polish state's staunch adherence to the Catholic faith.

In the 1820s a young and then-unknown Polish composer, Frederic Chopin, was resident in the then-Russian banking capital of Berdychiv. Having been taught to play string instruments by a Czech music professor, he set about supervising the installation of St Barbara's original pipe organ; this church organ, which the great Chopin played, was destroyed by the Communists in the 20th century.

Further fame was brought to Berdychiv's main catholic church by the celebrated marriage of French author Honoré de Balzac to his Polish aristocratic bride and landowner Countess Ewelina Hańska in 1850. Subsequently, the eminent Anglo-Polish writer, Joseph Conrad, was baptized at the basilica in 1857.

All churches throughout Russia were suppressed by the Government of the Union of Soviet Socialist Republics with Berdychiv's basilica being no exception; it was later converted into a People's Sports College for Children.

St. Barbara's Church was reconsecrated by the Catholic Church, in 1993, to serve again as a place of worship.

See also

 Berdychiv
 Polish–Lithuanian Commonwealth
 Roman Catholicism in Ukraine

References

External links
Berdychiv Revival Project: Distinguished Shrines of Berdychiv

Berdychiv
1700s in Ukraine
18th-century Roman Catholic church buildings in Ukraine
Roman Catholic churches completed in 1759
Roman Catholic churches completed in 1826
Baroque church buildings in Ukraine
Roman Catholic churches in Ukraine
Ukrainian Catholic churches in Ukraine